This a list of airports in Mayotte, sorted by location.

Mayotte is an overseas department of France at the northern end of the Mozambique Channel in the Indian Ocean, between northern Madagascar and northern Mozambique. It is geographically part of the Comoro Islands.



Airports 

ICAO location identifiers are linked to each airport's Aeronautical Information Publication (AIP), which are available online in Portable Document Format (PDF) from the French Service d'information aéronautique (SIA). Locations shown in bold are as per the airport's AIP page. Most airports give two locations: the first is the city served, second is the city where the airport is located.

Airport names shown in bold indicate the airport has scheduled service on commercial airlines.

See also 
 List of airports in France
 List of airports by ICAO code: F#FM - Comoros, Mayotte, Réunion, and Madagascar
 Wikipedia: Airline destination lists: Africa#Mayotte (France)

References 
 Aeronautical Information Service / Service d'information aéronautique (SIA) 
 Aeronautical Information Publications (AIP) 
 Union des Aéroports Français 
 
  - includes IATA codes
 Great Circle Mapper: Airports in Mayotte - IATA and ICAO codes
 World Aero Data: Airports in Mayotte - ICAO codes

 
Airports
Mayotte
Mayotte